The Ihungia River is a river of the northeastern North Island of New Zealand.

See also
List of rivers of New Zealand

References

Rivers of the Gisborne District
Rivers of New Zealand